The West Coast Line is a railway line between Gothenburg and Lund, which runs along the West Coast of Sweden. It is electrified all the way, but as of 2021 was still not completed, as the part through Varberg and the part between Helsingborg and Ängelholm are both single-track. In northern Helsingborg the track follows a 150 year old right of way, which is full of curves that have too small radii, together with a very steep climb. Passing trains must not run faster than 30 km/h during inclement weather. Double track construction takes place between 2020 and 2023.

A doubletrack tunnel under the city of Varberg is under construction since 2019.

References

 
Railway lines in Sweden
Rail transport in Gothenburg
Rail transport in Skåne County